The 1973 City of Lincoln Council election were the first elections to the newly created City of Lincoln Council and took place on 7 June 1973. This was on the same day as other local elections.  The Local Government Act 1972 stipulated that the elected members were to shadow and eventually take over from the predecessor corporation on 1 April 1974. The election resulted in the Democratic Labour Party gaining control of the council.

Overall results

|-
| colspan=2 style="text-align: right; margin-right: 1em" | Total
| style="text-align: right;" | 30
| colspan=5 |
| style="text-align: right;" | 21,732
| style="text-align: right;" |

Ward results

Abbey (3 seats)

Boultham (3 seats)

Bracebridge (3 seats)

Carholme (3 seats)

Castle (3 seats)

Ermine (3 seats)

Hartsholme (3 seats)

Minster (3 seats)

Moorland (3 seats)

Park (3 seats)

References

1973
1973 English local elections
1970s in Lincolnshire